The 2016 Sydney to Hobart Yacht Race, sponsored by Rolex and hosted by the Cruising Yacht Club of Australia in Sydney, New South Wales, was the 72nd annual running of the Sydney to Hobart Yacht Race. It began on Sydney Harbour at 1pm on Boxing Day (26 December 2016), before heading south for  through the Tasman Sea, Bass Strait, Storm Bay and up the River Derwent, to cross the finish line in Hobart, Tasmania. 88 vessels started.

Line honours were claimed by Perpetual LOYAL, which broke Wild Oats XI 2012 race record, to finish in a time of 1 day, 13 hours, 31 minutes and 20 seconds. Giacomo (Jim Delegat) earned the Tattersall's Cup.

Results

Line honours (Top 10)

Handicap results (Top 10)

References

Sydney to Hobart Yacht Race
Sydney
Sydney
December 2016 sports events in Australia